(living space) is a German concept of settler colonialism, the philosophy and policies of which were common to German politics from the 1890s to the 1940s. The most extreme form of this ideology was supported by the Nazi Party and Nazi Germany.  was a leading motivation of Nazi Germany to initiate World War II, and it would continue this policy until the end of World War II.

Following Adolf Hitler's rise to power,  became an ideological principle of Nazism and provided justification for the German territorial expansion into Central and Eastern Europe. The Nazi policy  was based on its tenets. It stipulated that Germany required a  necessary for its survival and that most of the indigenous populations of Central and Eastern Europe would have to be removed permanently (either through mass deportation to Siberia, extermination, or enslavement), including Polish, Ukrainian, Russian, Czech, and other Slavic nations considered non-Aryan. The Nazi government aimed at repopulating these lands with Germanic colonists in the name of  during and following World War II. Entire indigenous populations were decimated by starvation, allowing for their own agricultural surplus to feed Germany.

People deemed to be part of non-Aryan races, within the territory of  expansion, were subjected to expulsion or destruction. The eugenics of  assumed it to be the right of the German Aryan master race to remove the indigenous people in the name of their own living space. They took inspiration for this concept from outside Germany. Hitler and Nazi officials took a particular interest in manifest destiny, and attempted to replicate it in occupied Europe. Nazi Germany also supported other Axis Powers' expansionist ideologies such as Fascist Italy's  and Imperial Japan's .

Origins

In the 19th century, the term  was used by the German geographer and biologist Oscar Peschel in his 1860 review of Charles Darwin's Origins of Species (1859). In 1897, the geographer and ethnographer Friedrich Ratzel in his book  applied the word  ("living space") to describe physical geography as a factor that influences human activities in developing into a society. In 1901, Ratzel extended his thesis in his essay titled "".

During the First World War, the Allied naval blockade of the Central Powers caused food shortages in Germany, and resources from German colonies in Africa were unable to slip past the blockade; this caused support to rise during the war for a  that would expand Germany eastward into Russia to gain control of their resources to prevent such a situation from occurring in the future. In the period between the First and the Second World Wars, German nationalists adopted the term  in their political demands for the re-establishment of the German colonial empire, which had been dismembered by the Allies at Versailles. Ratzel said that the development of a people into a society was primarily influenced by their geographic situation (habitat) and that a society that successfully adapted to one geographic territory would naturally and logically expand the boundaries of their nation into another territory. Yet, to resolve German overpopulation, Ratzel said that Imperial Germany (1871–1918) required overseas colonies to which surplus Germans ought to emigrate.

Geopolitics
Friedrich Ratzel's metaphoric concept of society as an organism—which grows and shrinks in logical relation to its  (habitat)—proved especially influential upon the Swedish political scientist and conservative politician Johan Rudolf Kjellén (1864–1922), who interpreted that biological metaphor as a geopolitical natural-law.

Kjellén's geopolitical interpretation of the  concept was adopted, expanded, and adapted to the politics of Germany by publicists of imperialism such as the militarist General Friedrich von Bernhardi (1849–1930) and the political geographer and proponent of geopolitics Karl Haushofer (1869–1946). In  (1911; Germany and the Next War), General von Bernhardi developed Friedrich Ratzel's  concept as a racial struggle for living space, explicitly identified Eastern Europe as the source of a new, national habitat for the German people, and said that the next war would be expressly for acquiring —all in fulfillment of the "biological necessity" to protect German racial supremacy.

Racial ideology
The politician Adolf Hitler said that the Nazi geopolitics of "inevitable expansion" would reverse overpopulation, provide natural resources, and uphold German national honor.

The Nazi usages of the term  were explicitly racial, to justify the mystical right of the racially superior Germanic peoples to fulfill their cultural destiny at the expense of racially inferior peoples, such as the Slavs of Poland, Russia, Ukraine, and the other non–Germanic peoples of "the East". Based upon Johan Rudolf Kjellén's geopolitical interpretation of Friedrich Ratzel's human-geography term, the Nazi régime (1933–45) established  as the racist rationale of the foreign policy by which they began the Second World War, on 1 September 1939, in an effort to realise the Greater Germanic Reich at the expense of the societies of Eastern Europe.

First World War nationalist premise

However, military over-extension lost the war for Imperial Germany, and the  went unrealised.

In April 1915, Chancellor von Bethmann Hollweg authorised the Polish Border Strip plans in order to take advantage of the extensive territories in Eastern Europe that Germany had conquered and held since early in the war. The decisive campaigns of Imperial Germany almost realised  in the East, especially when Bolshevik Russia unilaterally withdrew as a combatant in the "Great War" among the European great powers—the Triple Entente (the Russian Empire, the French Third Republic, and the United Kingdom) and the Central Powers (the German Empire, Austria-Hungary, the Ottoman Empire, and the Kingdom of Bulgaria).

In March 1918, in an effort to reform and modernise the Russian Empire (1721–1917) into a soviet republic, the Bolshevik government agreed to the strategically onerous territorial cessions stipulated in the Treaty of Brest-Litovsk (33% of arable land, 30% of industry, and 90% of the coal mines of Russia). As a result, Russia yielded to Germany much of the arable land of European Russia, the Baltic governorates, Belarus, Ukraine, and the Caucasus region. Despite such an extensive geopolitical victory, tactical defeat in the Western Front, strategic over-extension, and factional division in government compelled Imperial Germany to abandon the Eastern European  gained with the Treaty of Brest-Litovsk in favour of the peace-terms of the Treaty of Versailles (1919), and yielded those Russian lands to Estonia, Latvia, Lithuania, Poland, and Ukraine.

Twenty-five years later, Nazi foreign policy resumed the cultural goal of the pursuit and realisation of German living-space at the expense of non-German peoples in Eastern Europe with the September Campaign (1 September – 6 October 1939) that began the Second World War in Europe. In Germany and the Two World Wars, the German historian Andreas Hillgruber said that the territorial gains of the Treaty of Brest-Litovsk (1918) were the imperial prototype for Adolf Hitler's Greater German Empire in Eastern Europe:

The  (1914) documents " in the East" as philosophically integral to Germanic culture throughout the history of Germany; and that  is not a racialist philosophy particular to the 20th century. Politically, the  allowed the Imperial Government to learn the opinions of the nationalist, economic, and military elites of the German ruling class who financed and facilitated geopolitics. Nationally, the annexation and ethnic cleansing of Poland for German  was an official and a popular subject of "nationalism-as-national-security" endorsed by German society, including the Social Democratic Party of Germany (SDP). In The Origins of the Second World War, the British historian A. J. P. Taylor wrote:

Interwar propaganda
Despite each slogan (political and racial) being contradicted by the reality of such demographic facts, the nationalists' demands for  proved to be ideologically valid politics in Weimar Germany.

Studies of the homeland focused on the lost colonies after the establishment of the Second Polish Republic, which was ratified by the Treaty of Versailles, as well as the "eternal Jewish threat" (1937). Emphasis was put on the need for rearmament and the pseudoscience of superior races in the pursuit of "blood and soil".

During the twenty-one-year inter-war period between the First (1914–18) and the Second (1939–45) World War,  for Germany was the principal tenet of the extremist nationalism that characterised German party politics. The Nazis, led by Adolf Hitler, demanded not only the geographic reversion of Germany's post-war borders (to recuperate territory lost by the Treaty of Versailles), but also the German conquest and colonisation of Eastern Europe (whether or not those lands were German before 1918). To that end, Hitler said that flouting the Treaty of Versailles was required for Germany to obtain needed  in Eastern Europe. During the 1920s, Heinrich Himmler—as a member of the Artaman League, an anti-Slav, anti-urban, and anti-Semitic organisation of "blood and soil" ideology—developed the  ideas that advocated , for the realisation of which he said that the:

as theory in Hitlerism 

In  (1925), Hitler dedicated a full chapter—titled "Eastern Orientation or Eastern Policy"—to outlining the need for the new "living space" for Germany. He claimed that achieving  required political will, and that the Nazi movement ought to strive to expand population area for the German people and acquire new sources of food.  became the principal foreign-policy goal of the Nazi Party and the government of Nazi Germany (1933–45). Hitler rejected the restoration of the pre-war borders of Germany as an inadequate half-measure towards reducing purported national overpopulation. From that perspective, he opined that the nature of national borders is always unfinished and momentary, and that their redrawing must continue as Germany's political goal.

The ideologies found at the root of Hitler's implementation of  modeled that of German colonialism of the New Imperialism period as well as the American ideology of manifest destiny. Hitler had great admiration for the United States' territorial expansion and was fascinated by the genocide of Native Americans that took place during the United States' westward expansion and used this in part for justification of German expansion. He believed that in order to transform the German nation into a world superpower, Germany had to expand their geopolitical presence and act only in the interest of the German people. Hitler had also viewed with dismay the German reliance on food imports by sea during the First World War, believing it to be a contributing factor to Germany's defeat in the war. He believed that only through  could Germany shift "its dependence for food... to its own imperial hinterland". At a conference in 1941, Hitler stated:

sequel, 1928
To further German population growth, Hitler rejected the ideas of birth control and emigration, arguing that such practices weakened the people and culture of Germany, and that military conquest was the only means for obtaining :

Therefore, the non-Germanic peoples of the annexed foreign territories would never be Germanised:

Foreign-policy prime directive
The conquest of living space for Germany was the foremost foreign-policy goal of the Nazis towards establishing the Greater Germanic Reich that was to last a thousand years. The USSR was the country to provide sufficient  for the Germans, because it possessed much agricultural land, and was inhabited by Slavic  ruled by Jewish Bolshevism. The racism of Hitler's  philosophy allowed only the Germanisation of the soil and the land, but not of the native peoples, who were to be destroyed, by slave labour and starvation.

Ideological motives
In the worldview of Adolf Hitler, the idea of restoring the 1914 borders of the German  (Imperial Germany, 1871–1918) was absurd, because those national borders did not provide sufficient  for the German population; only a foreign policy for the geopolitical conquest of the proper amount of  would justify the necessary sacrifices entailed by war. He thought that history was dominated by a merciless struggle for survival among the different races of mankind; and that the races who possessed a great national territory were innately stronger than those races who possessed a small national territory—which the Germanic Aryan race could take by natural right. Such official racist perspectives for the establishment of German  allowed the Nazis to unilaterally launch a war of aggression against the countries of Eastern Europe, ideologically justified as historical recuperation of the Oium (lands) that the Slavs had conquered from the native Ostrogoths.

Although Hitler openly spoke about the need for living space in the 1920s, he never publicly spoke about it during his first years in power. It was not until 1937, with the German rearmament program well under way, that he began again to publicly speak about the need for living space.

in practice: the Second World War 

On 6 October 1939, Hitler told the Reichstag that after the fall of Poland the most important matter was "a new order of ethnographic relations, that is to say, resettlement of nationalities". On 20 October 1939, Hitler told General Wilhelm Keitel that the war would be a difficult "racial struggle" and that the General Government was to "purify the Reich territory from Jews and Polacks, too."

In 1941, in a speech to the Eastern Front Battle Group Nord, Himmler said that the war against the Soviet Union was a war of ideologies and races, between Nazism and Jewish Bolshevism and between the Germanic (Nordic) peoples and the  peoples of the East. In that vein, Himmler published the pamphlet , which featured photographs of ideal racial types, Aryans, contrasted with the barbarian races, descended from Attila the Hun and Genghis Khan, to the massacres committed in the Soviet Union dominated by Jewish Bolshevism.

With the Polish decrees (8 March 1940), the Nazis ensured that the racial inferiority of the Poles was legally recognized in the German Reich, and regulated the working and living conditions of Polish laborers. The Polish decrees also established that any Pole "who has sexual relations with a German man or woman, or approaches them in any other improper manner, will be punished by death." The  were vigilant of sexual relations between Germans and Poles, and pursued anyone suspected of race defilement; likewise, there were proscriptions of sexual relations between Germans and other ethnic groups brought in from Eastern Europe.

As official policy,  Heinrich Himmler said that no drop of German blood would be lost or left behind to mingle with any alien races; and that the Germanisation of Eastern Europe would be complete when "in the East dwell only men with truly German [and] Germanic blood". In the secret memorandum Reflections on the Treatment of Peoples of Alien Races in the East (25 May 1940), Himmler outlined the future of the Eastern European peoples: (i) division of native ethnic groups found in the new living-space; (ii) limited, formal education of four years of elementary school (to teach them only how to write their names and to count to five hundred); and (iii) obedience of the orders of Germans.

Despite Nazi Germany's official racism, the extermination of Eastern European native populations was not always necessary because the racial policy of Nazi Germany regarded some Eastern European peoples as being of Aryan-Nordic stock, especially the local leaders. On March 4, 1941, Himmler introduced the German People's List, which intended to segregate the inhabitants of German-occupied territories into categories of desirability according to criteria. In the same memorandum, Himmler advocated the kidnapping of children who appeared to be Nordic because it would "remove the danger that this subhuman people of the East through such children might acquire a leader class from such people of good blood, which would be dangerous for us because they would be our equals." According to Himmler, the destruction of the Soviet Union would have led to the exploitation of millions of peoples as slave labor in the occupied territories and the eventual re-population of the areas with Germans.

Classification under the laws in the annexed territories
The Deutsche Volksliste was split into four categories. Men in the first two categories were required to enlist for compulsory military service.

He believed that no visible differences between peoples could be bridged by the use of a common language. Any such attempts would lead to the "bastardization" of the German element, he said. Likewise, Hitler criticized the previous attempts at Germanisation of the Poles in the Prussian Partition as an erroneous idea, based on the same false reasoning. The Polish people could not possibly be Germanised by being compelled to speak German because they belonged to a different race, he said; "the result would have been fatal" for the purity of the German nation because the foreigners would "compromise" by their inferiority "the dignity and nobility" of the German nation. During the war, Hitler remarked in his "Table Talk" that people should only be Germanised if they were to improve the German blood line:

Informed by the blood and soil beliefs of ethnic identity—a philosophic basis of —Nazi policy required destroying the USSR for the lands of Russia to become the granary of Germany. The Germanisation of Russia required the destruction of its cities, in an effort to vanquish Russianness, Communism, and Jewish Bolshevism. To that effect, Hitler ordered the Siege of Leningrad (September 1941 – January 1944), to raze the city and destroy the native Russian population. Geopolitically, the establishment of German  in the east of Europe would thwart blockades, like those that occurred during the First World War, which starved the people of Germany. Moreover, using Eastern Europe to feed Germany also was intended to exterminate millions of Slavs, by slave labour and starvation. When deprived of producers, a workforce, and customers, native industry would cease and disappear from the Germanised region, which then became agricultural land for settlers from Nazi Germany.

Plans for the Germanisation of western Europe were less severe, as the Nazis needed the collaboration of the local political and business establishments, especially that of local industry and their skilled workers. Moreover, Nazi racial policies considered the populations of western Europe more racially acceptable to Aryan standards of racial purity. In practice, the number and assortment of Nazi racial categories indicated that "East is bad and West is acceptable"; thus, a person's "race" was a matter of life or death in countries under Nazi occupation.

The racist ideology of  also comprised the North German racial stock of the northern-European peoples of Scandinavia (Denmark, Norway, Sweden); and the continental-European peoples of Alsace and Lorraine, Belgium and northern France; whilst the United Kingdom would either be annexed or be made a puppet state. Moreover, the poor military performance of the Italian armed forces forced Fascist Italy's withdrawal from the war in 1943, which then made northern Italy a territory to be annexed to the Greater Germanic Reich.

Collaborationism

For political expediency, the Nazis continually modified their racist politics towards non–Germanic peoples—and so continually redefined the ideological meaning of —in order to collaborate with other peoples, in service of the Reich's foreign policy. Early in his career as leader of the Nazis, Adolf Hitler said he would accept friendly relations with the USSR, on condition that the Soviet government re-establish the disadvantageous borders of European Russia, which were demarcated in the Treaty of Brest-Litovsk (1918). This made possible the restoration of Russo–German diplomatic relations.

In 1921–22, Hitler said that German  might be achieved with a smaller USSR, created by sponsoring anti-communist Russians in deposing the Communist government of the Bolsheviks; however, by the end of 1922, Hitler changed his opinion when there arose the possibility of an Anglo–German geopolitical alliance to destroy the USSR. However, following the invasion of the USSR in Operation Barbarossa (1941), the strategic stance of the Nazi régime towards a smaller, independent Russia was affected by political pressure from the German Army, who asked Hitler to endorse the creation of the anti–Communist Russian Liberation Army (ROA) and its integration into the Wehrmacht operations in Russia. The ROA was an organisation of defectors, led by General Andrey Vlasov, who meant to depose the régime of Josef Stalin and the Russian Communist Party.

Initially, Hitler rejected the idea of collaborating with the peoples in the East. However, Nazis such as Joseph Goebbels and Alfred Rosenberg were in favour of collaboration against Bolshevism and offering some independence to the peoples of the East. In 1940, Himmler opened up membership for people he regarded as being of "related stock", which resulted in a number of right-wing Scandinavians signing up to fight in the Waffen-SS. When the Germans invaded the Soviet Union in 1941, further volunteers from France, Spain, Belgium, the Netherlands, Czechoslovakia, and Croatia signed up to fight for the Nazi cause. After 1942, when the war turned decisively against Nazi Germany, further recruits from the occupied territories signed up to fight for the Nazis. Hitler was worried about the foreign legions on the Eastern Front; he remarked that "One mustn't forget that, unless he is convinced of his racial membership of the Germanic , the foreign legionary is bound to feel that he's betraying his country."

After further losses of manpower, the Nazis tried to persuade the forced foreign laborers in the Reich to fight against Bolshevism. Martin Bormann issued a memorandum on 5 May 1943:

In 1944, as the German army continually lost battles and territory to the Red Army, the leaders of Nazi Germany, especially  Heinrich Himmler, recognised the political, ideological, and military value of the collaborationist ROA in fighting Jewish Bolshevism. Secretly, Himmler in his Posen speeches remarked: "I wouldn't have had any objections, if we had hired Mr. Vlasov and every other Slavic subject wearing a Russian general's uniform, to make propaganda against the Russians. I wouldn't have any objections at all. Wonderful."

Implementation

The Polish Campaign was Nazi Germany's first implementation of  policy, beginning with the Occupation of Poland (1939–1945). In four years of Germanisation (1940–44), the Nazis forcibly removed some 50,000 ethnic Poles from the Polish territories annexed to the Greater German , notably some 18,000–20,000 ethnic Poles from Żywiec County, in Polish Silesia, effected in Action Saybusch.

The Nazi invasion of Poland consisted of atrocities committed against Polish men, women, and children. The German population's psychological acceptance of the atrocities was achieved with Nazi propaganda (print, radio, cinema), a key factor behind the manufactured consent that justified German brutality towards civilians; by continually manipulating the national psychology, the Nazis convinced the German people to believe that Slavs and Jews were Untermenschen. For example, leaders of the Hitler Youth were issued pamphlets (such as On the German People and its Territory) meant to influence the rank-and-file Hitler Youth about the necessity of Nazi racist practices in obtaining  for the German people.

East–West frontier
Concerning the geographic extent of the Greater Germanic , Adolf Hitler rejected the Ural Mountains as an adequate eastern border for Germany, arguing that such mid-sized mountains would not suffice as the boundary between the "European and Asiatic worlds", and that only a living wall of racially pure Aryans would suffice as a border. He also advocated that permanent war in the East would "preserve the vitality of the race":

In 1941, the Reich decided that within two decades, by the year 1961, Poland would have been emptied of Poles and re-populated with ethnic-German colonists from Bukovina, Eastern Galicia, and Volhynia. Baltic Germans from Estonia and Latvia were evaluated for racial purity; those classified to the highest category, were resettled in the Eastern Wall.

Moreover, the Germanisation of Russia which began with Operation Barbarossa (June–September 1941) meant to conquer and colonise European Russia as the granary of Germany. For those Slavic lands, the Nazi theorist and ideologue Alfred Rosenberg proposed administrative organisation by the —countries consolidated into colonial realms ruled by a commissar:

In 1943, in the secret Posen speeches, Heinrich Himmler spoke of the Ural Mountains as the eastern border of the Greater Germanic Reich. He asserted that the Germanic race would gradually expand to that eastern border, so that, in several generations' time, the German , as the leading people of Europe, would be ready to "resume the battles of destiny against Asia", which were "sure to break out again"; and that the defeat of Europe would mean "the destruction of the creative power of the Earth". Nonetheless, the Ural Mountains were a secondary objective of the secret  (Master Plan East) for the colonisation of Eastern Europe.

The never-established Reichskommissariat Turkestan would have been the closest territory to Imperial Japan's north-westernmost extents of its own Greater East Asia Co-Prosperity Sphere, as a "living wall" said to be defending the easternmost  lands. It also would have elevated higher-social-class Chinese and nearly all Japanese-ethnicity populations as "honorary Aryans", partly to Hitler's own stated respect in Mein Kampf towards those specific East Asian ethnicities.

Nonetheless, despite the initial strategic successes of Operation Barbarossa, the Red Army's counterattack victories against the German Army at the Battle of Stalingrad (August 1942 – February 1943) and at the Battle of Kursk (July – August 1943) in Russia, plus the Allied Operation Husky (July – August 1943) in Sicily, thwarted the full implementation of Nazi  in Eastern Europe.

Historical retrospective

Scale

During the Posen speeches, Himmler spoke about the deaths of millions of Soviet prisoners of war and foreign labourers:

Ideology
Racism usually is not a concept integral to the ideology of territorial expansionism; nor to the original meaning of the term  ("biological habitat"), as defined by the ethnographer and geographer Friedrich Ratzel. Nonetheless, Nazism, the ideology of the Nazi Party, established racism as a philosophic basis of -as-geopolitics; which Adolf Hitler presented as Nazi racist ideology in his political autobiography  (1926–28). Moreover, the geopolitical interpretations of national living-space by the academic Karl Haushofer (a teacher of Rudolf Hess, Hitler's deputy) provided Adolf Hitler with the intellectual, academic, and scientific rationalisations that justified the territorial expansion of Germany—by the natural right of the German Aryan race—to expand into, occupy, and exploit the lands of other countries, regardless of the native populations. In , Hitler explained the living-space "required" by Nazi Germany:

Contemporary usages
Since the end of World War II, the term  has been used in relation to different countries throughout the world, including China, Egypt, Israel, Turkey, Poland, and the United States.

See also
 Colonialism
 Expansionism for expansionist ideas in other countries
 Imperial German plans for the invasion of the United States
 Imperialism
 Irredentism
 A land without a people for a people without a land
 Malthusianism

Nazi Germany
 
 
 Greater Germany
 Greater Germanic Reich
 Hunger Plan
 
 Expulsion of Poles by Nazi Germany (1939–1944)
 
 Wehrbauer, settlers of some of the  lands

Empire of Japan
 
 An Investigation of Global Policy with the Yamato Race as Nucleus
 Greater East Asia Co-Prosperity Sphere of the Empire of Japan, the equivalent of Lebensraum in the Empire of Japan
 Jewish settlement in the Japanese Empire before and during World War II

Fascist Italy
 Fourth Shore
 Imperial Italy
 Mare Nostrum
 Manifesto of Race

Footnotes

References
  [Also:]  [And:]  [As well as:]

Further reading

External links
 The Invasion of the Soviet Union and the Beginnings of Mass Murder , in the Yad Vashem website
 Utopia: The Greater Germanic Reich of the German Nation—A map of Nazi plans for German empire

Anti-Slavic sentiment
Anti-Polish sentiment
Anti-Ukrainian sentiment
Anti-Russian sentiment
Anti-Latvian sentiment
Anti-Estonian sentiment
Axis powers
German nationalism
German words and phrases
Germany–Poland relations
Nazi terminology
Germanization
Theories of history